LZ may refer to:

Computing
 .lz, a filename extension for an lzip archive
 Abraham Lempel (born 1936) and Jacob Ziv (born 1931), Israeli computer scientists:
 Lempel-Ziv, prefix for family of data compression algorithms, sometimes used as beginning for file name extensions
 Lempel–Ziv–Markov chain algorithm

Aviation
 Republic of Bulgaria (aviation code)
 Air Link IATA code
 Balkan Bulgarian Airlines IATA code (1947-2002)
 Swiss Global Air Lines  IATA code (2005-2018)
 Landing zone, an area where aircraft can land
 LZ-, prefix of the serial numbers of Zeppelin airships built by Ferdinand von Zeppelin

Other uses
 LUX-ZEPLIN, a dark matter detection experiment
 Lubrizol, a chemical manufacturer (NYSE symbol LZ)
 Lutz jump, a figure skating jump
 Led Zeppelin, an English rock band

See also
 Landing zone (disambiguation)
 ZL (disambiguation)
 IZ (disambiguation)
 1Z (disambiguation)